IFA Wartburg was a Swedish pop duo, consisting of Magnus Michaeli and Nils Lundwall, under the aliases Rolf Kempinski and Heinz Klinger, named after the automobile brand Wartburg of the East German manufacturer Industrieverband Fahrzeugbau (IFA). Singing in the German language, the lyrics of their music evoke the vocabulary of the GDR, while also appearing apolitical and playful. Typical song titles include Frau Gorbatschowa tanzt Bossanova (Mrs. Gorbachev dances bossa nova), Es ist nicht so schlimm auf der Insel Krim (It's not so bad on the island of Crimea) and Agrarwissenschaft im Dienste des Sozialismus (Agrarian science in service of socialism).

Their music was eclectic, ranging from bossa nova (Frau Gorbatschowa tanzt Bossanova), pop/ska (Freie Deutsche Jugend), to jazz and swing (Spassjazz).

They toured Germany and Switzerland in 1998, attracting the attention of the German media.

Albums 

 Im Dienste des Sozialismus, CD, 1998
 Der Berliner, CD, 1998
 Im Dienste des Sozialismus, Vinyl (picture disc) with the faces of Erich Honecker and Queen Silvia of Sweden.

References

External links
 

Swedish musical groups